Sauroglossum is a genus of flowering plants from the orchid family, Orchidaceae. The genus is endemic to South America. As of June 2014, the following species are recognized:

Sauroglossum andinum (Hauman) Garay - Ecuador, Argentina
Sauroglossum aurantiacum (C.Schweinf.) Garay - Peru
Sauroglossum corymbosum (Lindl.) Garay - Peru, Bolivia
Sauroglossum distans Lindl. ex Garay - Bolivia
Sauroglossum dromadum Szlach. - Peru
Sauroglossum elatum Lindl - Ecuador, Argentina, Colombia, Brazil
Sauroglossum longiflorum (Schltr.) Garay - Ecuador, Colombia
Sauroglossum odoratum Robatsch - Rio de Janeiro
Sauroglossum organense Szlach. - Rio de Janeiro
Sauroglossum schweinfurthianum Garay - Peru
Sauroglossum sellilabre (Griseb.) Schltr. - Paraguay, Argentina

See also
 List of Orchidaceae genera

References

External links

IOSPE orchid photos, Sauroglossum elatum, photo by Patricia Harding
Projeto Orchidstudium, 'Sauroglossum elatum''

 
Cranichideae genera
Orchids of South America